Márcio Piancastelli (1936 - June 18, 2015) was a Brasilian automobile designer widely known for his work at Volkswagen do Brasil, where he designed the highly acclaimed Volkswagen Brasília and Volkswagen SP2.

Background
Born Márcio Lima Piancastelli in 1936 in Belo Horizonte, Minas Gerais to a Catholic family of Italian descent. Piancastelli's father owned a furniture factory, where Marcio first showed an interest in design. He sketched cars throughout his childhood as well as futuristic cities — and later studied architecture. Piancastelli was trained musician and played cello, violin and double bass.

When he was 26, he placed second in a design contest with drawings of a small sports car he named Itapuan. The jury for the contest included Giuseppe Farina, Brooks Stevens, Mario Fissore and Luigi Segre from Carrozzeria Ghia. He would later again enter the Lucio Meira design contest, in 1966 and 1972.

Piancastelli died on June 18, 2015 at the age of 79, following a long illness and chemotherapy — survived by his wife; daughter, Alessandra Iha Piancastelli Lóss; and son-in-law Marcelo Lóss.

Career 

Following the Lucio Meira Design Contest, juror Luigi Segre offered Piancastelli a one-year internship at Carrozzeria Ghia in Turin, Italy. In February 1963, Piancastelli traveled by ship to Italy.  

As it happened, Segre died suddenly, without informing his colleagues of Piancastelli's pending arrival.  Piancastelli nonetheless stayed the year; learning and developing his skills; creating proposals for Ghia customers and participating in meetings with Ford, Jaguar, Borgward, Renault and Lamborghini — including one meeting with Ferruccio Lamborghini. He left at the end of 1964, but not before traveling in Europe while staying with his sister in Milan. 

After his internship with Ghia, Piancastelli was hired by Willys Overland Do Brasil where he worked on the development of "Project M", which would later become the Ford Corcel after Ford took over the company in 1967. He worked also for  DKW-Vemag/DKW Fissori. Also in 1967, but before Project M was finished, Piancastelli left Willys to join the team of the newly opened Interior department at Volkswagen. where he produced his most notable designs. 

Despite the assumption that VW do Brasil and Piancastelli would only be refining designs from Germany, he set out immediately to create and innovate, sometimes in seclusion. Piancastelli's first project at Volkswagen in 1969 was to facelift the Volkswagen Type 3 for the Brazilian market, earning Piancastelli a bonus from Rudolf Leiding, then head of VW Brazil. 

Directed by Schiemann and Leiding, and working with colleagues José 'Jota' Vicente Novita Martins and Jorge Yamashita Oba, Piancastelli designed Volkswagen's variant of the Brazilian-made Puma using the Volkswagen Type III platform and an existing 1600cc Volkswagen engine (quickly superseded by an upgraded 1700cc engine). The result was the Volkswagen SP2, named after the city of San Paulo. The night before the design was presented to Management for final approval, Piancastelli and his colleagues reworked the model to reduce the front overhang by 10cm. 

Piancastelli's later designed an economy car using the Volkswagen Beetle mechanicals with updated bodywork. Piancastelli's solution, using elements from the Brooks Stevens-designed Volkswagen 412 and the Karmann Ghia's widened platform, became the Volkswagen Brasília, selling over 950,000 units in Brazil and another 180,000 internationally. The project became a favorite of Piancastelli, and he personally drove a series of  Brasílias for his personal use over the course of 15 years. 

With the creation of Autolatina (1987-1996, a joint venture between Volkswagen do Brasil, Ford do Brasil and others), Piancastelli was able to reconnect with colleagues from Willys-Overland, as Ford had taken over the Willys-Overland business in Brazil. With the VW/Ford joint venture, Piancastelli ultimately executed VW designs for VW and  rebadged variants for Ford, including the VW Santana/Ford Versailles, VW Santana Quantum/Ford Royale, Ford Verona/VW Apollo.

After retiring from VW in 1992 to his home in Araçoiaba da Serra, Piancastelli continued his private design work, including home appliances; attended collector events and, when requested, signed the bodywork of cars he'd designed.

At the very end of his life, author Alexander Gromow arranged for a 3D renderer to meet with Piancastelli and model the Pian GT — the first design that Piancastelli had done during his internship at Carrozzeria Ghia in Turin in 1963.

References 

1936 births
2015 deaths
Volkswagen Group people
Automobile designers
Ghia people